Atlantic and Western Railroad may refer to:
Atlantic and Western Railroad (Florida), 1888–1896, predecessor of the Florida East Coast Railway
Atlantic and Western Railroad (North Carolina), now the Atlantic and Western Railway
Atlantic and Great Western Railroad
Western and Atlantic Railroad